Gravy was an American band out of New York City. The musicians Julie Cafritz of Pussy Galore, Joey Defilipps of When People Were Shorter and Lived Near the Water and Kim Rancourt of To Live and Shave in L.A. In 1996, the band released the EP After That It's All Gravy on Fused Coil.

History
Gravy was founded in 1994 out of New York City by Julie Cafritz, Joey Defilipps and Kim Rancourt. In August 1996 the band released their debut EP titled After That It's All Gravy. The album was produced with the assistance of Don Fleming of noise rock group B.A.L.L. and vocalist Jared Louche of industrial rock group Chemlab.

Discography
Expanded plays
 After That It's All Gravy (1996, Fused Coil)

References

External links 
 

Musical groups established in 1996
Musical groups disestablished in 1996
1996 establishments in New York City
1996 disestablishments in New York (state)
American experimental musical groups
Fifth Colvmn Records artists